Simplicia butesalis is a moth of the family Erebidae first described by Francis Walker in 1859. It is found in Borneo, Sumatra, Peninsular Malaysia and Sri Lanka.

References

Moths of Asia
Moths described in 1859
Herminiinae